Loafer is a 2015 Indian Telugu-language action drama film written and directed by Puri Jagannadh. It stars Varun Tej and newcomer Disha Patani while Revathi and Posani Krishna Murali appear in crucial supporting roles. The film was officially launched on 8 July 2015 in Hyderabad.

The film was released on 17 December 2015 in more than 750 screens across the globe and received mixed reviews from critics and eventually underperformed at the box office. It was later dubbed into Hindi under the title Loafer The Hero for direct telecast on Zee Cinema in 2016. It was later dubbed in Tamil.

Plot
Murali (Posani Krishna Murali) and his wife, Lakshmi Devi (Revathi) are a married couple who are deeply in love are the parents of Raja (Varun Tej). Murali demands money from his mother and father-in-law, Lakshmi Devi's parents, which prompts Lakshmi Devi to separate from him. Murali steals their son Raja from his wife and takes him to Jodhpur where they live as grifters.
A girl, Parijatam (Disha Patani) arrives in Jodhpur while escaping from an unwanted marriage proposal. Raja and Parijatam fall in love with one another, which causes Murali to reveal Parijatam's location to her family.

Cast

 Varun Tej as Raja Murali
 Disha Patani as Mouni/Parijatam
 Revathi as Lakshmi Murali, Raja's mother
 Posani Krishna Murali as Murali, Raja's father
 Brahmanandam as Srimanthudu
 Mukesh Rishi as Mouni's father
 Ali as Spider Babu
 Charandeep Surineni as Rama; Mouni's brother who killed his own mother 
 Pavitra Lokesh as Mouni's mother
 Shatru as Rama's Henchmen in Jodhpur  
 Dhanraj as Raja's friend
 Sapthagiri as Raja's friend
 Uttej as Tourist @ Jodhpur fort
 Sandeep Madhav as thief
 Nora Fatehi as an item number "Nokkey Dochey"

Production
Puri was approached by C. Kalyan to direct a film for Varun Tej. The filming began at July 2015 and completed in October 2015.

Music 

The official soundtrack of Loafer consisting of five songs was composed by Sunil Kashyap. The audio launch event was held at Shilpakala Vedika, Hyderabad with Prabhas as chief guest.

References

External links
 

2015 films
2010s Telugu-language films
2015 action drama films
Indian action drama films
Films directed by Puri Jagannadh